California Rehabilitation Center (CRC) is a  state prison located in Norco, Riverside County, California. The prison is sometimes referenced as "Norco" or "Norco Prison".

Facilities
CRC has  and is located next to the Naval Surface Warfare Center Corona Division. As of Fiscal Year 2006/2007, CRC had a total of 1,169 staff and an annual operating budget of $118 million. As of September 2007, it had a design capacity of 2,314 but a total institution population of 4,271, for an occupancy rate of 184.6 percent. It has Level II ("Open dormitories with secure perimeter fences and armed coverage") housing.

As of July 31, 2022, CRC was incarcerating people at 107.2% of its design capacity, with 2,322 occupants.

CRC is currently run as a "non-designated" facility, meaning inmates are neither SNY (Special Needs Yard) or GP (General Population). However, in California prison culture this non-designation makes this a de facto SNY yard, despite CDCR's assertion.

Programs
The best-known of CRC's programs are the "six structured Substance Abuse Programs." CRC "offers the world's largest in-custody substance abuse program and is the only institution in the state to offer recovered inmates the chance to erase their felony convictions." It is the "only [California] prison to house felons along with low-level, drug-addicted inmates."

The drug treatment programs are thought to be associated with lower recidivism rates. However, in February 2007 the California Office of the Inspector General concluded "Numerous studies show that despite an annual cost of $36 million, the Department of Corrections and Rehabilitation’s in-prison substance abuse treatment programs have little or no impact on recidivism."

However, the report specifically mentioned the "Quest male civil addict program" at CRC, for which "12-month recidivism rates... were lower for non-participants than for participants." The efficacy of in-prison substance abuse treatment is based on voluntary participation, segregation from the general population and participation in aftercare. When these three aspects were in place at another California prison, three year recidivism was dropped from 75% to 27%.

The center runs an actors studio called the Actors' Gang program. The studio participates in Commedia dell'arte, overseen by Tim Robbins and Sabra Williams.

History
On the site where CRC now stands, the  Lake Norconian Resort opened in 1929 as "the opulent playground of some of Hollywood's biggest names."  The Norconian hotel closed in 1940, then served as a Navy hospital between 1941 and 1957. "The old Norconian and several of the newer outlying buildings were turned over to the state" to create CRC, and the first inmates arrived in January 1963; however, in 2002 "CRC vacated the building after learning it had to be seismically retrofitted." Efforts are underway to preserve the hotel.

There are persistent yet untrue stories among CRC inmates and some staff that the abandoned Norconian hotel was used for the cover artwork for the Eagles' album Hotel California. These stories claim that the front cover shot, and/or the rear cover interior shot were taken at the hotel. This has contributed to the prison's nickname of "Hotel California" among inmates throughout the California prison system. 

As of 2006, although CRC was considered "one of California's best prisons," it was overcrowded, was "under nearly constant lockdown to prevent fights," had buildings "so antiquated that the electricity is shut off during rainstorms so the prisoners aren't electrocuted," had a "three-month-long waiting list" for its drug rehabilitation program, and was "short 75 guards."  In March 2007 Governor Arnold Schwarzenegger visited the prison, citing its "huge overcrowding problem" in a speech on his "prison and county jail-building program."

Although CRC had been "the only California prison to house both men and women," in April 2007 the women's wing of CRC was closed "to make room for more men" and because "the aging facility did not have the space needed to properly care for female inmates."  About 800 female CRC inmates were moved to California Institution for Women, Central California Women's Facility, and Valley State Prison for Women. On April 22, 2019, a Northrop N-9M aircraft crashed in the grounds of the facility, killing its pilot. There were no ground casualties.

Notable inmates
Archie Bryant - Currently serving a 16 year sentence for his part in the conspiracy to commit murder case of Sunny Han.
Tim Lambesis - Pled guilty to soliciting the murder of his wife, released on parole after serving two years of his six year sentence.

See also

References

External links
 

1962 establishments in California
Prisons in California
Prisons in Riverside County, California